Sara Sefchovich (born Sara Sefchovich Wasongarz; April 2, 1949 in Mexico City) is a Mexican writer.

Biography
She studied sociology at the National Autonomous University of Mexico (UNAM), earning a master's degree in 1987 and a doctorate degree in 2005 in History of Mexico. Later, she also did research at the Instituto de Investigaciones Sociales ("Institute of Social Research") of the institution. She has written articles for the magazines Fem, Revista Mexicana de Sociología, Cuadernos de Comunicación, Los Universitarios, Revista de la Universidad de México, Casa del Tiempo, La Semana de Bellas Artes, La Cultura en México, Sábado and the newspapers La Jornada and El Universal.

Her first novel Demasiado amor earned her the Agustín Yáñez Award in 1990 and was adapted in 2002 into the film of the same name starring Ari Telch. She has also written La señora de los sueños (1993) and La suerte de la consorte (1999).

In 1995 she participated in the homage to Luis Spota at the Palacio de Bellas Artes with other prominent writers such as Jaime Labastida, Elda Peralta, Pedro Angel Palou, Bernardo Ruiz and Cuban writer Lisandro Otero.

Awards
 Agustín Yáñez Award (1990)
 Plural de Ensayo Award (1989)
 Gabino Barreda Medal by the UNAM (1989)

Works

Books

Vivir la vida (2000), 
La suerte de la consorte (1999; 2002, second edition), 
La señora de los sueños (1993), 
Demasiado amor (1990), 
País de Mentiras (2009),

Essays
 Veinte preguntas ciudadanas a la mitad más visible de la pareja presidencial con todo y sus respuestas (también ciudadanas) (2004)
 La teoría de la literatura de Luckacs (1978)
 Ideología y ficción en la obra de Luis Spota (1985)
 México: país de ideas, país de novelas (una sociología de la literatura mexicana) (1987)

Translations
 El patriarcado capitalista y la situación del feminismo socialista (1980) of Zilla H. Eisenstein.

See also
 List of Mexicans

External links
  Her personal website
  Biography
  Profile at the UNAM
  Resume
 
  Escritoras judiomexicanas contemporaneas ("Jewish Mexican contemporary female writers"), a book about Sefchovich and other writers
  Biography of Lisandro Otero with mention of the Luis Spota homage
 Gender and Identity Formation in Contemporary Mexican Literature at amazon.com, a critique on the narrative strategies and representational devices used by Sefchovich and other Mexican writers
  Interview to Sefchovich in regards to Martha Sahagún and the essay about her as the wife of Vicente Fox, president of Mexico

References

1949 births
Living people
Jewish women writers
Mexican people of Russian-Jewish descent
20th-century Mexican historians
Mexican women novelists
Mexican Jews
Writers from Mexico City
National Autonomous University of Mexico alumni
Academic staff of the National Autonomous University of Mexico
El Colegio de México alumni
Mexican women historians